Hans Joachim Meyer (born 13 October 1936) is a German politician (CDU).   He served in the de Maizière cabinet as the last East German Minister for Education and the Arts.   After reunification he became  in the regional government of Saxony.   In addition, he served between 1997 and 2009 as President of the Central Committee of German Catholics ("Zentralkomitee der deutschen Katholiken" / ZdK).

Life 
Hans Joachim Meyer was born in Rostock. He grew up, after 1945, in the Soviet occupation zone which was relaunched in October 1949 as the Soviet sponsored German Democratic Republic (East Germany). After successfully completing his school studies in Rostock he moved to the Berlin area. The real issue, he later told an interviewer, was his commitment to the Catholic Church. His decision while still at school to join the CDU back in 1952, at a time when the ruling party was engaged in a robust campaign to take control of rival political parties, will already have drawn him to the attention of the authorities as a potential dissident in the making. For the next year he worked as an "assistant" at the VEB Lokomotivbau Potsdam-Babelsberg (factory) as the nearby rail-locomotive plant was known at that time. After that, resigning from the CDU in 1961, he was able to restart his university studies, now embarking on a course at the Humboldt University of Berlin of English and American Studies and Philology. His decision to select a subject that was seen by the authorities as less directly political was vindicated, in that this time he was able to complete his course, emerging with his university degree in 1964. He remained at the Humboldt as a teacher and senior research assistant between 1964 and 1982. He received his doctorate in 1971. His dissertation was, again, resolutely non-political:  it comprised a semantic analysis of the modern English verb prefix "Up" when compared to related prefixes in English and German ("Semantische Analyse der modernenglischen Verbalpartikel "up" im Vergleich zu verwandten englischen und deutschen Verbalpartikeln"). Ten years later his habilitation, received in 1981, could have opened the way to a lifelong university career, had "events" not intervened. He was assigned to the Foreign Languages section between 1973 and 1977, becoming deputy director for education and training. Between 1978 and 1990 he headed up the Intensive Languages Training section at the Humboldt. He also held an appointment as Professor of Applied Linguistics between 1985 and 1990.

During his academic career in East Berlin Meyer was engaged with the church.  Between 1973 and 1975 he served as a member of the Dresden Pastoral Synod of the region covered by the German Democratic Republic.   Between 1976 and 1982 he worked with the Pastoral Council for the Bishopric in respect of East Berlin.

During the later 1980s the winds of Perestroika blowing cross from, of all places, Moscow, found a growing resonance on the streets in the German Democratic Republic, (even if the government was appalled). In November 1989 street protestors broke through the Berlin Wall, and it quickly became apparent that Fraternal Forces from the east had received no orders to intervene militarily. There would be no repeat of 1953 or of the tragedy of 1968 in Prague. A seemingly unstoppable series of events now unfolded leading to the country's first (and, as matters turned out, last) free and fair election. In previous general elections, turn-pout had always been recorded at around 99% of eligible voters and the proportion of votes cast for the  ruling Socialist Unity Party had always been recorded at around 99% of votes cast. However, results in March 1990 indicated significant levels of support for various political parties, with the CDU and its centre-right allies winning 48% of the votes. Shortly after that Meyer received and accepted an invitation to join the new government headed up by Lothar de Maizière, despite not being at this stage a member of any political party, and despite not having stood for election to the national parliament ("Volkskammer"). Between 12 April and 3 October 1990 Meyer served as the German Democratic Republic's last Minister for Minister for Education and the Arts. The commission was mandated to adapt an education system that would be implemented across a unified Germany. The commission's output was summarized in the Reunification Treaty (Articles 37 & 38) which came into force in October 1990 and was then implemented both at government level and on the ground.

In August 1990 the East German CDU (party) formally merged back into the West German CDU from which it had been forcibly separated by the post-war division of Germany, and Hans Joachim Meyer took the opportunity to rejoin the party from which, out of "disappointment over the party's limited political options", he had resigned in 1961.

Awards and honours 

 2002: Honorary doctorate from the  TU Dresden (university)
 2003: Honorary membership of the Saxony Academy of Arts and Sciences
 2005: Order of Merit of the Federal Republic of Germany
 2008: 
 2013: 
 2015: Order of Merit of the Free State of Saxony
 2017: Order of St. Gregory the Great

Output (selection)

References 

20th-century German politicians
People from Rostock
Academic staff of the Humboldt University of Berlin
Christian Democratic Union (East Germany) politicians
Christian Democratic Union of Germany politicians
German Roman Catholics
Linguists from Germany
Government ministers of East Germany
Ministers of the Saxony State Government
Commanders Crosses of the Order of Merit of the Federal Republic of Germany
Recipients of the Order of Merit of the Free State of Saxony
Knights Commander of the Order of St Gregory the Great
1936 births
Living people